Pleiomorpha homotypa is a moth of the family Gracillariidae. It is found in South Africa.

The larvae feed on Diospyros lycioides. They mine the leaves of their host plant. The mine has the form of a small, oblong, transparent, tentiform mine along the mid-rib.

References

Endemic moths of South Africa
Gracillariinae
Moths of Africa
Moths described in 1961